Goldisthal is a municipality in the Sonneberg district of Thuringia, Germany.

The Goldisthal Pumped Storage Station, one of Europe's largest pumped-storage hydroelectric power stations, is located in this village.

References

Sonneberg (district)
Schwarzburg-Rudolstadt